Madacantha is a genus of East African orb-weaver spiders containing the single species, Madacantha nossibeana. It was first described by M. Emerit in 1970, and has only been found in Madagascar.

References

Araneidae
Monotypic Araneomorphae genera
Spiders of Madagascar